

Peter (died 1085) was a medieval cleric. He became Bishop of Lichfield in 1072, then his title changed to Bishop of Chester when the see was moved in 1075.

Peter had been a royal chaplain before being nominated to the see of Lichfield. Nothing else is known of his background, although presumably he was a Norman, as were most of King William I of England's episcopal appointments. He may have been a royal clerk of King Edward the Confessor, although one charter of 1065 which lists his name is a forgery. He was the custodian of the see of Lincoln, before his elevation to the episcopate. He was consecrated after May 1072 and died in 1085. Peter pillaged the abbey of Coventry, "forcing an entry into their dormitory and breaking into their strongboxes, robbing them of their horses and all their goods" and was censured by Archbishop Lanfranc of Canterbury, who chastised him that "it is neither your role or as a bishop nor within your power to do these things". Peter was buried at Chester. The historian Katharine Keats-Rohan suggests that he was the uncle of Regenbald, a royal clerk under King Edward and King William.

Citations

References

Further reading

 Cherry, J. "The lead seal matrix of Peter, bishop of Chester" Antiquaries Journal Vol. 65 (1985), p. 472–3 and pl. CVI b

11th-century English Roman Catholic bishops
Bishops of Lichfield
Bishops of Chester (ancient)
1085 deaths
Year of birth unknown